The 1991–92 Slovenian Hockey League was the first season of the Slovenian Hockey League. Prior to this, Slovenia was part of SFR Yugoslavia and Slovenian teams participated in the Yugoslav Ice Hockey League.

At the end of the regular season the playoffs were held. Jesenice went on to win the first Slovenian Hockey Championship.

Teams

Standings after the regular season

Play-offs

First Part

Final
Jesenice defeated Olimpija 4–3 in a best of seven series.
Olimpija – Jesenice 4–3 
Jesenice – Olimpija 4–3 
Olimpija – Jesenice 2–3 
Jesenice – Olimpija 6–3
Olimpija – Jesenice 3–0
Jesenice – Olimpija 2–5
Olimpija – Jesenice 3–6

Third place
Bled defeated Jesenice II 3–0 in a best of five series.
Bled – Jesenice II 9–3
Jesenice II – Bled 1–10
Bled – Jesenice II 7–1

1991–92 in Slovenian ice hockey
Slovenia
Slovenian Ice Hockey League seasons